Bjerregaard is a surname. Notable people with the surname include:

André Bjerregaard (born 1991), Danish footballer
Ditlev Trappo Saugmand Bjerregaard (1852–1916), Danish businessman, traditional musician, and composer 
Helle Bjerregaard (born 1968), Danish footballer
Henning Bjerregaard (1927–2014), Danish footballer
Henrik Anker Bjerregaard (1792–1842), Norwegian poet, dramatist and judge
Johnny Bjerregaard (born 1943), Danish footballer and coach
Lucas Bjerregaard (born 1991), Danish golfer
Mathilde Bjerregaard (born 1993), Danish handball player 
Patrick Bjerregaard (born 1995), Danish badminton player
Per Bjerregaard (born 1946), Danish educated physician and former footballer
Ritt Bjerregaard (born 1941), Danish politician